The 2022 election to the City of Edinburgh Council took place on Thursday 5 May 2022, on the same day as the 31 other local authorities in Scotland. The election used the same 17 wards used in 2017; each ward elects three or four councillors using the single transferable vote system (a form of proportional representation).

After the 2017 election, the SNP and Labour formed a minority coalition to run the council. For the first time however, the SNP were the largest party.

Background

Composition
Since the previous election, several changes in the composition of the council occurred. Most were changes to the political affiliation of councillors including SNP councillors Lewis Ritchie, Gavin Barrie, Claire Bridgman and Derek Howie and Conservative councillor Ashley Graczyk who resigned from their respective parties and became independents. Two by-elections were held and resulted in an SNP gain from Labour and an SNP hold. Green councillor Gavin Corbett resigned from the council after being made a special adviser to the Scottish Government but as his resignation was less than six months prior to the election, a by-election was not called to replace him.

Notes

Retiring councillors

Results

|- class="unsortable" class="sortbottom"
| style="background-color:#EAECF0; font-weight:bold; text-align:center;" colspan="2" |Total
| style="background-color:#EAECF0; text-align:right;" |63
| style="background-color:#EAECF0; text-align:right;" | -
| style="background-color:#EAECF0; text-align:right;" | -
| style="background-color:#EAECF0; text-align:right;" | -
| style="background-color:#EAECF0; text-align:right;" | -
| style="background-color:#EAECF0; text-align:right;" | 100.00
| style="background-color:#EAECF0; text-align:right;" | 186,218
| style="background-color:#EAECF0; text-align:right;" | -

Ward summary

|- class="unsortable" align="centre"
!rowspan=2 align="left"|Ward
! %
!Seats
! %
!Seats
! %
!Seats
! %
!Seats
! %
!Seats
! %
!Seats
!rowspan=2|Total
|- class="unsortable" align="center"
!colspan=2 |SNP
!colspan=2 |Lib Dem
!colspan=2 |Labour
!colspan=2 |Green
!colspan=2 |Conservative
!colspan=2 |Others
|-
|align="left"|Almond
|20.9%
|1
|59.9%
|3
|4.9%
|
|5.3%
|
|7.5%
|
|1.5%
|
|4
|-
|align="left"|Pentland Hills
|31.3%
|2
|8.0%
|
|17.1%
|1
|7.8%
|
|34.0%
|1
|1.7%
|
|4
|-
|align="left"|Drum Brae/Gyle
|23.9%
|1
|51.8%
|2
|6.2%
|
|5.9%
|
|11.1%
|
|1.1%
|
|3
|-
|align="left"|Forth
|31.0%
|1
|19.7%
|1
|18.9%
|1
|12.7%
|1
|15.1%
|
|2.7%
|
|4
|-
|align="left"|Inverleith
|19.7%
|1
|33.7%
|1
|12.6%
|
|12.8%
|1
|20.0%
|1
|1.2%
|
|4
|-
|align="left"|Corstorphine/Murrayfield
|18.7%
|1
|49.8%
|2
|7.8%
|
|6.9%
|
|16.0%
|
|0.8%
|
|3
|-
|align="left"|Sighthill/Gorgie
|36.2%
|2
|4.2%
|
|23.0%
|1
|13.3%
|1
|11.8%
|
|11.5%
|
|4
|-
|align="left"|Colinton/Fairmilehead
|17.3%
|1
|12.4%
|
|33.4%
|1
|5.4%
|
|29.9%
|1
|1.6%
|
|3
|-
|align="left"|Fountainbridge/Craiglockhart
|22.7%
|1
|7.1%
|
|22.4%
|1
|19.9%
|
|26.6%
|1
|1.2%
|
|3
|-
|align="left"|Morningside
|15.5%
|
|21.2%
|1
|23.2%
|1
|21.1%
|1
|17.6%
|1
|1.4%
|
|4
|-
|align="left"|City Centre
|24.5%
|1
|15.1%
|
|14.6%
|1
|19.8%
|1
|21.4%
|1
|4.5%
|
|4
|-
|align="left"|Leith Walk
|30.7%
|1
|12.0%
|1
|18.7%
|1
|25.9%
|1
|6.9%
|
|5.7%
|
|4
|-
|align="left"|Leith
|32.6%
|1
|4.3%
|
|21.4%
|1
|25.7%
|1
|9.0%
|
|7.0%
|
|3
|-
|align="left"|Craigentinny/Duddingston
|36.7%
|1
|6.7%
|
|20.6%
|1
|16.5%
|1
|19.4%
|1
|colspan="2" rowspan="2" 
|4
|-
|align="left"|Southside/Newington
|19.2%
|1
|16.1%
|1
|24.1%
|1
|23.0%
|1
|17.6%
|
|4
|-
|align="left"|Liberton/Gilmerton
|30.7%
|2
|4.1%
|
|33.3%
|1
|8.2%
|
|18.0%
|1
|5.7%
|
|4
|-
|align="left"|Portobello/Craigmillar
|37.4%
|1
|4.3%
|
|23.9%
|1
|16.2%
|1
|15.3%
|1
|2.9%
|
|4
|- class="unsortable" class="sortbottom"
!align="left"| Total
!25.9%
!19
!20.5%
!12
!19.1%
!13
!14.2%
!10
!17.5%
!9
!2.8%
!0
!63
|}

Ward results

Almond
2017: 2xLib Dem; 1xSNP; 1 Con
2022: 3xLib Dem; 1xSNP
2017-2022 Change: One Liberal Democrat gain from Conservative.

Pentland Hills
2017: 2xCon; 1xSNP; 1xLab
2022: 2xSNP; 1xCon; 1xLab
2017-2022 Change: One SNP gain from Conservative.

Drum Brae/Gyle
2017: 1xLib Dem; 1xCon; 1xSNP
2022: 2xLib Dem; 1xSNP
2017-2022 Change: One Liberal Democrat gain from Conservative.

Forth
2017: 2xSNP; 1xCon; 1xLab
2022: 1xSNP; 1xLib Dem; 1xLab; 1xGrn
2017-2022 Change: One Liberal Democrat and one Green gain from SNP and Conservative.

Inverleith
2017: 2xCon; 1xSNP; 1xLib Dem
2022: 1xLib Dem; 1xCon; 1xSNP; 1xGrn
2017-2022 Change: One Green gain from Conservative.

Corstorphine/Murrayfield
2017: 1xCon; 1xLib Dem; 1xSNP
2022: 2xLib Dem; 1xSNP
2017-2022 Change: One Liberal Democrat gain from Conservative.

Sighthill/Gorgie
2017: 2xSNP; 1xLab; 1xCon
2022: 2xSNP; 1xLab; 1xGrn
2017-2022 Change: One Green gain from Conservative.

Colinton/Fairmilehead
2017: 2xCon; 1xLab
2022: 1xLab; 1xCon; 1xSNP
2017-2022 Change: One SNP gain from Conservative.

Fountainbridge/Craiglockhart
2017: 1xCon; 1xGrn; 1xSNP
2022: 1xCon; 1xLab; 1xSNP
2017-2022 Change: One Labour gain from Green.

Morningside
2017: 1xCon; 1xGrn; 1xLab; 1xLib Dem
2022: 1xLab; 1xLib Dem; 1xGrn; 1xCon
2017-2022 Change: No change.

City Centre
2017: 1xCon; 1xSNP; 1xGrn; 1xLab
2022: 1xSNP; 1xGrn; 1xCon; 1xLab
2017-2022 Change: No change.

Leith Walk
2017: 2xSNP; 1xGrn; 1xLab
2022: 1xSNP; 1xGrn; 1xLab; 1xLib Dem
2017-2022 Change: One Liberal Democrat gain from SNP.

Leith
2017: 1xSNP; 1xGrn; 1xLab
2022: 1xSNP; 1xGrn; 1xLab
2017-2022 Change: No change.

Craigentinny/Duddingston
2017: 1xSNP; 1xCon; 1xLab; 1xGrn
2022: 1xSNP; 1xLab; 1xCon; 1xGrn
2017-2022 Change: No change.

Southside/Newington
2017: 1xCon; 1xSNP; 1xGrn; 1xLab
2022: 1xLab; 1xGrn; 1xSNP; 1xLib Dem
2017-2022 Change: One Lib Dem gain from Conservative.

Liberton/Gilmerton
2017: 2xSNP; 1xLab; 1xCon
2022: 2xSNP; 1xLab; 1xCon
2017-2022 Change: No change.

Portobello/Craigmillar
2017: 1xSNP; 1xLab; 1xCon; 1xGrn
2022: 1xSNP; 1xLab; 1xGrn; 1xCon
2017-2022 Change: No change.

Aftermath
After the election, the SNP remained the largest party, but Labour took control of the council after giving the Liberal Democrats and Conservatives paid convenership and deputy posts on key committees. In a sign of internal unease at the deal, Labour councillors Katrina Faccenda and Ross McKenzie abstained. This came after a coalition between the SNP and Greens was blocked as a result of the deal between Labour, the Liberal Democrats and Conservatives, which combined obtained 32 votes, compared to the 29 votes for the SNP-Green deal. 

Several current and former elected Scottish Labour representatives were critical of the deal involving the Conservatives. Former Edinburgh North and Leith MP Mark Lazarowicz described the deal in the capital as "unacceptable", whilst Neil Findlay, who was a regional MSP for Lothian from 2011 and 2021, said: "I am appalled to see West Lothian Labour Councillors voting Tories into office - the Tory party is the enemy of my class." In addition, the Labour MSP for North East Scotland, Mercedes Villalba, expressed disdain for the deal on Twitter. She stated, "No Labour representative worth the name would ever put the Tories in power."

Changes since 2022
† On 28 June 2022, the Labour group suspended Leith councillor Katrina Faccenda and Sighthill/Gorgie councillor Ross McKenzie for opposing their deal with the Conservatives, reducing the administration to 11 members.
†† SNP Councillor for Corstorphine/Murrayfield, Frank Ross, resigned on 16th December 2022 causing a by-election. The by-election was held on 9th March 2023 and was won by Fiona Bennett of the Scottish Liberal Democrats.
‡ After having the whip restored, McKenzie resigned on 23 February 2023 in protest at the way the council's 2023–24 budget was passed.

By-elections since 2022

References

City of Edinburgh Council elections
Edinburgh
2020s in Edinburgh